Emily St. John Mandel (born 1979) is a Canadian novelist and essayist. She has written six novels, including Station Eleven (2014), The Glass Hotel (2020), and Sea of Tranquility (2022). Station Eleven, which has been translated into 33 languages, has been adapted into a limited series on HBO Max. The Glass Hotel was translated into twenty languages and was selected by Barack Obama as one of his favorite books of 2020. Sea of Tranquility was published in April 2022 and debuted at number three on The New York Times Best Seller list.

Early life
Mandel was born in spring 1979 in Merville, British Columbia, Canada. Her Canadian mother is a social worker and her American father is a plumber. St. John, her grandmother’s surname, is her middle name.

She was home-schooled there until the age of fifteen, during which time she began keeping a daily diary. She left high school when she was eighteen to study contemporary dance at The School of Toronto Dance Theatre.

She worked with independent choreographers. She was also administrative assistant at a Manhattan law firm and helped with grants at the Anderson Center for Cancer Research at Rockefeller University.

Career
In 2002, Mandel began writing her first novel, Last Night in Montreal, while living in Montreal. She is a staff writer for The Millions, an online magazine. In 2012, she used the Goodreads database to write an article for The Millions, analyzing statistics relating to novels with titles in "The ___'s Daughter" pattern. In 2016, she wrote a subsequent article, analyzing statistics relating to novels that included the word "girl" in the title. One of her findings was that the girl of the title is "significantly more likely to end up dead" if the author of the book is male.

Novels 
Mandel's first three novels are Last Night in Montreal (2009), The Singer's Gun (2009), and The Lola Quartet (2012). Unbridled Books published all three novels.

Last Night in Montreal, follows a young woman with a secret who cannot seem to settle in one city. When she is pursued by a private detective and a former lover, she is forced to come to terms with her own past and the secrets that haunt a childhood she cannot remember.

The Singer's Gun tells the story of Anton Waker, who grew up surrounded by corruption, but has now decided to live a more honourable life. His life unravels when his cousin blackmails him into doing one last job. As a result, his forged Harvard diploma is revealed, and his secretary disappears. Anton must choose between his loyalty to his family and his desire to live life with integrity.

The Lola Quartet is a literary noir novel that takes place in Florida following the 2008 economic collapse. Gavin, a recently fired journalist and former jazz musician, is contacted by his sister who believes she has discovered a daughter he never knew he had. Jobless, Gavin returns to his hometown and begins searching for his unknown child and the supposed mother—his high school girlfriend.

Station Eleven 

Mandel's fourth novel, Station Eleven (2014), is a post-apocalyptic novel set in the near future in a world ravaged by the effects of a virus and follows a troupe of Shakespearean actors who travel from town to town around the Great Lakes region. It was nominated for the National Book Award, the PEN/Faulkner Award for Fiction and the Baileys Women's Prize for Fiction, and won the Arthur C. Clarke Award and the Toronto Book Award. A film adaptation of the novel was developed by producer Scott Steindorff. The resulting ten-episode limited mini-series on HBO Max, Station Eleven, premiered on December 16, 2021.

Station Eleven was selected for the 2023 edition of Canada Reads, where it will be championed by Michael Greyeyes.<ref>"Meet the Canada Reads 2023 contenders". CBC Books, January 25, 2023.</ref>

 The Glass Hotel 
Her fifth novel, a mystery thriller titled The Glass Hotel, was shortlisted for the Giller Prize in 2020 and was recommended by Barack Obama when he released a list of his favourite books from 2020. In August 2019, NBCUniversal International Studios acquired the rights to The Glass Hotel for a television series adaptation, with producer Lark Productions. Mandel is writing the screenplay.

 Sea of Tranquility 
Mandel’s sixth novel, Sea of Tranquility, was published in 2022. It is a work of speculative fiction and explores questions pertaining to time travel and the simulation hypothesis. It debuted at number 3 on The New York Times Best Seller list for "Combined Print & E-Book Fiction," and number 2 for "Hardcover Fiction." Barack Obama included the novel on his list of favourite books from 2022.

 Personal life 
After studying dance, Mandel lived in Toronto and Montreal before relocating to New York City. She married Kevin Mandel, a writer and executive recruiter, with whom she has a daughter. They divorced in 2022.

As of 2022, she lives in Brooklyn, New York and has a girlfriend.

Publications

Novels

 Last Night in Montreal, Unbridled Books (2009) 
 The Singer's Gun, Unbridled Books (2010) 
 The Lola Quartet, Unbridled Books (2012) 
 Station Eleven, Knopf (2014) 
 The Glass Hotel, Knopf, (2020) 
 Sea of Tranquility, Knopf, (2022) 

Short stories

 "The Chameleon Machine" in The Late American Novel: Writers on the Future of the Book. Jeff Martin and C. Max Magee, editors (2011) 
 "Drifter" in Venice Noir. Maxim Jakubowski, ed. Akashic (2012) 
 "Drifter" in The Best American Mystery Stories 2013. Lisa Scottoline, editor. Houghton Mifflin Harcourt  (2013) 
 "Long Trains Leaving" in Goodbye To All That: Writers on Loving and Leaving New York, Sari Botton, editor. Seal Press (2013) 
 "The Violist" in Imaginary Oklahoma. Jeff Martin, editor. This Land Press (2013) 
 "Mr. Thursday" in Slate (March 16, 2017). reprinted in Out of the Ruins. Preston Grassmann, editor. Titan Books (2021) 

Essays

 "Emilie" in The Millions (April 19, 2010)
 "Nicholas Carr’s The Shallows: What the Internet Is Doing To Our Brains" in The Millions (October 25, 2010)
 "On Bad Reviews" in The Millions (February 7, 2011)
 "The Second Life of Irmgard Keun" in The Millions (February 7, 2011)
 "Irène Némirovsky, Suite Française, and The Mirador" in The Millions (September 2, 2011)
 "The ___'s Daughter" in The Millions (March 28, 2012)
 "Eating Dirt: On Charlotte Gill and the Life of the Treeplanter" in The Millions (September 6, 2012)
 "Susanna Moore, Cheryl Strayed, and the Place Where the Writers Work" in The Millions (October 4, 2012)
 "Strange Long Dream: Justin Cronin's The Twelve" in The Millions (October 15, 2012)
 "Drinking at the End of the World: Lars Iver's Exodus" in The Millions (February 22, 2013)
 "I Await the Devil's Friend Request: On Social Media and Mary MacLane" in The Millions (March 29, 2013)
 "The Bulldozing Powers of Cheap" in The Millions (June 28, 2013)
 "Motherless Tacoma: On Eric Barnes’s Something Pretty, Something Beautiful" in The Millions (July 11, 2013)
 "A Woman’s Unraveling: On Suzanne Rindell’s The Other Typist" in The Millions (July 31, 2013)
 "The Asking is Both Graceful and Profound: On the Stories of Josephine Rowe" in The Millions (August 8, 2013)
 "On The Pleasures and Solitudes of Quiet Books" in The Millions (August 27, 2013)
 "A Closed World: On By Grand Central Station I Sat Down and Wept" in The Millions (March 7, 2014)
 "You'll Probably Never Catch Ebola—So Why is the Disease so Terrifying?" in The New Republic (August 12, 2014)
 "Susan Sontag, Essayist and So Much Else" in Humanities, 35:5 (September/October 2014)
 "The Land of Ice and Snow: On Lars Iyer's 'Wittgenstein Jr.'" in The Millions (November 24, 2014)
 "The Year of Numbered Rooms" in Humanities, 37:2 (Spring 2016)
 "The Gone Girl With the Dragon Tattoo on the Train" in FiveThirtyEight (October 2016)
 "A Year in Reading: Emily St. John Mandel" in The Millions (December 2, 2017)
 "Year in Reading: Emily St. John Mandel" in The Millions (December 23, 2018)

Awards

 2014: Prix Mystère de la Critique, Best Foreign Novel for The Singer's Gun 2014: finalist, National Book Award for Station Eleven 2015: Arthur C. Clarke Award for Station Eleven 2015: Toronto Book Award for Station Eleven 2015: finalist, PEN/Faulkner Award for Fiction for Station Eleven 2015: longlisted, Baileys Women's Prize for Fiction for Station Eleven 2017: Prix des Libraires du Québec, Novel Category Outside Quebec for Station Eleven 2020: shortlisted for Scotiabank Giller Prize for The Glass Hotel 2022: Goodreads Choice Awards, Best Science Fiction for Sea of Tranquility''

References

External links 

 

Living people
1979 births
21st-century Canadian novelists
21st-century Canadian women writers
Canadian science fiction writers
Canadian women novelists
PEN/Faulkner Award for Fiction winners
Women science fiction and fantasy writers
Writers from British Columbia
Canadian people of American descent
Canadian LGBT writers
21st-century Canadian LGBT people